The U.S. Highways in Utah are maintained by the Utah Department of Transportation (UDOT). The United States Numbered Highway System is a nationwide system with only a small portion of its routes entering Utah. Originally, the State Road Commission of Utah, created on March 23, 1909 was responsible for maintenance, but these duties were rolled into the new UDOT in 1975. Six former U.S. Highways exist in the state of Utah; of these, five have been replaced by current interstate and U.S. Highways, while the other was replaced by a state route. The most recent change was the redesignation of U.S. Route 666 as U.S. Route 491 in 2003.

Mainline routes

Special routes

See also

References

External links 

Data, Technology & Analytics Division

 
U.S.